As a nickname, Flip may refer to:

 Flip Benham (born 1948), American evangelical Christian minister and anti-abortion leader
 Flip Cornett (1957–2004), American funk guitarist and bassist
 Andrew Filipowski (born 1950), Polish-American technology entrepreneur 
 Flip Johnson (born 1963), American retired National Football League player
 Flip Kowlier (born 1976), Belgian singer-songwriter
 Flip Lafferty (1854–1910), American Major League Baseball player
 Flip Mark (born 1948), American former child actor
 Ronald Murray (born 1979), American former National Basketball Association player
 Flip Nicklin (born 1948), American whale photographer 
 Joseph "Flip" Nuñez, an American jazz musician of Filipino descent
 Flip Phillips (1915–2001), American jazz tenor saxophone and clarinet
 Scott Phillips (musician) (born 1973), American drummer for Alter Bridge and Creed
 Al Rosen (born 1924), American Major League Baseball third baseman
 Flip Saunders (1955-2015), American basketball coach
 Flip Simmons, Australian actor and musician
 Philip Slier (1923–1943), Dutch Jewish diarist and Holocaust victim
 P. F. Sloan (born 1945), American pop-rock singer and songwriter born Philip Gary Schlein
 Flip van der Merwe (born 1985), South African rugby union footballer
 Willie Williams (murderer) (1956–2005), American mass murderer
 Flip Wilson (1933–1998), American actor and comedian

See also 

Lists of people by nickname